Piggsburg Pigs! is a Fox Kids animated comedy series from Ruby-Spears Productions, which originally aired in 1990.

Ownership of the series passed to Disney in 2001 when Disney acquired Fox Kids Worldwide. The series is not available on Disney+.

Plot
Located behind the world's largest pig farm, the city of Piggsburg is a swine-only habitat. Here, the Bacon Brothers: Bo, Portley, and Pighead as well as their pet duck Quackers fight the evil plans of the hungry, carnivorous Wolf brothers Huff and Puff as well as the supernatural forces from the Forbidden Zone outside of Piggsburg. Other pig buddies of the Bacon Brothers include Dotty, Lorelei, the children Piggy, Pokey, and Prissy, and the snobby Rembrandt Proudpork. When not fighting off evil plots, the boys unwind at nearby Newpork Beach.

Cast
 Len Carlson as Rembrandt Proudpork
 Tara Charendoff as Dotty, Prissy
 Keith Knight as Portley Bacon
 Jonathan Potts as Bo Bacon
 Norm Spencer as Puff
 John Stocker as Huff

Additional
 Harvey Atkin
 Robert Bockstael
 Robert Cait
 Don Francks
 Catherine Gallant
 Rex Hagon
 Elizabeth Hanna
 Dan Hennessey - Police Officer ("Carnival of Evil")
 David Huband
 Gordon Masten
 Susan Roman
 Ron Rubin
 Greg Spottiswood
 Allen Stewart Coates
 Peter Wildman

Crew
 Stu Rosen - Voice Director, Sound Design
 Butch Hartman - Key Model Designer

Episodes

Home releases
The series has not been released on VHS or DVD in the United States, but a set of 3 DVDs containing 2 episodes each was released by Boulevard Entertainment in the United Kingdom in 2007.

References

External links

1990 American television series debuts
1990 Canadian television series debuts
1990s American animated television series
1990s Canadian animated television series
1991 American television series endings
1991 Canadian television series endings
Animated television series about pigs
American children's animated comedy television series
Canadian children's animated comedy television series
Comedy franchises
English-language television shows
Fantasy franchises
Fictional pigs
Fictional wolves
Fox Broadcasting Company original programming
Fox Kids
Television series by 20th Century Fox Television 
Television series by Fox Television Animation 
Television series by Ruby-Spears
Television series by Saban Entertainment
TVNZ 2 original programming